Jörg-Peter Ewert (born 1938 in the Free City of Danzig) is a German neurophysiologist and researcher in the field of Neuroethology.  From 1973 to 2006, he served as a university professor (Chair of Zoology/Physiology) in the Faculty of Natural Sciences at the University of Kassel, Germany.

Career
From 1958 to 1965 Jörg-Peter Ewert studied the specialties biology, chemistry, and geography at the University of Göttingen.  He graduated in 1965 and took up the specialty of zoology under the direction of the behavior physiologist Georg Birukow. The subject of Ewert's PhD (Dr.rer.nat.) dissertation was: "The influence of peripheral sensory and central nervous system responses on the readiness of the orienting movement in the common toad". Later he passed the state examination for the lecturing at secondary schools.

After 1966, he was a scientific assistant at the zoological institute of the Darmstadt University of Technology at Darmstadt. First he worked under the developmental physiologist Wolfgang Luther and continued under the sense physiologist Hubert Markl. In 1968 he received an invitation from the neurophysiologist Otto-Joachim Grüsser offering him a research visit for neuron recordings at the physiological institute of the Free University of Berlin. He used the methodological knowledge acquired to begin recording neurons from the visual system of the common toad.

In 1969 he obtained his Habilitation degree, the Venia Legendi for Zoology (focus on Physiology), at the Darmstadt University of Technology.

During a research project 1970–71, he worked as a Fellow of the Foundations' Fund for Research in Psychiatry with the neuropsychologist David J. Ingle at the McLean Hospital (Harvard Medical School) in Belmont, MA, USA.

From 1971 to 1972 he worked as a university professor at the zoological institute of the Darmstadt University of Technology.

In 1973, Ewert became the chair of Zoology/Physiology at the Faculty of Natural Sciences at the University of Kassel.  There he formed a Neuroethology team for research.  During the foundation phase of the university, he was authoritatively involved in the construction of the students' science curricula in the biology program.

In 1983 he was offered the chair of Zoology/Physiology at the University of Vienna. However, accepting the offer of the Minister for Culture of Hesse he opted to remain at the University of Kassel and worked there until his retirement in 2006.

From 2000 to 2004, Ewert led an expert group of the Council of Europe as a representative of the European Science Foundation (ESF).  The task of the Group of Experts on Amphibians and Reptiles was the revision of Appendix A to the European Convention for the Protection of Vertebrate Animals used for Experimental and other Scientific Purposes (CETS 123).

Memberships
For his scientific achievements research on amphibians in the field of neuroethology, Ewert was admitted as a fellow in the American Association for the Advancement of Science (AAAS). In 1993 he was nominated for the Max-Planck-Award.

In August 1981, Ewert, as director of the NATO Advanced Study Institute (NATO ASI), organized the International Conference of Advances in Vertebrate Neuroethology at the University of Kassel (Venue: Schlösschen Schönburg, Hofgeismar). On the occasion of this conference, the International Society for Neuroethology (ISN) was founded. Ewert was a member of the ISN Steering Committee.

Research in Neurobiology
Jörg-Peter Ewert is one of the pioneers of Neuroethology. Since 1963, he has studied the neurophysiological bases of visually controlled behavior in amphibians (Video), with particular emphasis on researching the common toad. His focus is on investigating neural correlates of classical ethological concepts such as "key stimulus" and "releasing mechanism".

Ewert has clarified the concept of a case-related key stimulus. The "key" does not refer to a specific stimulus feature, but on a neural algorithm that reveals the prey category by weighting critical feature components and comparing with non-prey cues. With his staff, he analyzed (i) neuronal circuits that translate visual sign stimuli into behavioral responses and (ii) neural loops that modulate – e.g., modify/specify – the translation.

Ewert's pioneering research in toad vision belongs to the model studies in neuroethology and was subject to scientific films produced in cooperation with the Institut für den Wissenschaftlichen Film IWF Knowledge and Media gGmbH (Göttingen): „Image Processing in the Visual System of the Common Tod: Behavior, Brain Function, Artificial Neuronal Net“ Video and „Gestalt Perception in the Common Toad, Part I-III“. Awards: Accredited by IAMS, International Association for Media in Science, 1994; Diploma of Honour, International Scientitic Film Association, XXXVth Congress and Festival, 1982, Jena; „Korak naprad“, Brofest ‘82, 1982, Belgrad/ NoviSad.

See also
 Vision in toads
 Neuroethology
 Feature detection (nervous system)

References

External links
 http://courses.cit.cornell.edu/bionb424/index.htm
 Zupanc, Günther K.H. (2004). Behavioral Neurobiology: An Integrative Approach. Oxford University Press. New York.
 Carew, Thomas, J. (2000). Behavioral Neurobiology: The Cellular Organization of Natural Behavior. Sinauer, Sunderland Mass.

20th-century German zoologists
German neuroscientists
Harvard Medical School people
University of Göttingen alumni
Scientists from Gdańsk
1938 births
Living people
Naturalized citizens of Germany
Academic staff of the University of Kassel
People from the Free City of Danzig
Neurophysiologists
McLean Hospital people
Academic staff of Technische Universität Darmstadt